Grieser is a German surname. Notable people with the surname include:

Angelika Grieser (born 1959), German swimmer
Manfred Grieser (born 1938), German discus thrower

See also
Rieser

German-language surnames
German toponymic surnames